Günyüzü is a town and district of Eskişehir Province in the Central Anatolia region of Turkey. According to 2010 census, population of the district is 7,025 of which 2,104 live in the town of Günyüzü.

Places of interest
Ruins of the Byzantine shrine St Michael at Germia are located in the village of Gümüşkonak, formerly known as Yörme, 8 km south of Günyüzü.

Notes

References

External links
 District governor's official website 
 District municipality's official website 
 Map of Günyüzü district

Towns in Turkey
Populated places in Eskişehir Province
Districts of Eskişehir Province